Aenictegues is the only genus of mites in the family Aenicteguidae, in the order Mesostigmata.

References

Mesostigmata